Ināra Rudko (born 21 July 1975) is a Latvian cross-country skier. She competed in four events at the 1998 Winter Olympics.

References

External links
 

1975 births
Living people
Latvian female cross-country skiers
Olympic cross-country skiers of Latvia
Cross-country skiers at the 1998 Winter Olympics
Sportspeople from Daugavpils
20th-century Latvian women